Rosneft-Baltika was a charter airline based in Rzhevka Airport near St Petersburg, Russia, which was founded in 1997. The airport was abandoned in 2007 with the runways now used for car parking, and none of their fleet has been spotted since. Because of this it is assumed the airline is no longer in operation.

Fleet

References

Defunct airlines of Russia
Airlines established in 1997
Airlines disestablished in 2007
Companies based in Saint Petersburg